('Rain on a moonlit night') is Jun Shibata's fifth studio album and the first with Victor Entertainment. It was released on February 21, 2007, and peaked at number 9.

Track listing
"Prologue" ('Prologue')
"" ('Blue Time')
""
"" ('Meal of Tears')
" ~vocal solo~" ( ～vocal solo～; 'Field on a Moonlight Night: Vocal Solo')
"" ('Falling Cherry Blossoms')
"" ('Midnight Chocolate')
""; 'Wife and Prince (Dear Prince: Third Chapter)')
"" ('Mermaid's Voice')
" ~piano solo~" ( ～piano solo～; 'Rainy Night Moon: Piano Solo')
"" ('Crimson Moon')
"" (…; 'If I Think of You...')
"" ('My Story')

Charts 

2007 albums
Victor Entertainment albums
Jun Shibata albums